Betty Winkelman (born 1936), better known by the pen name Lauren Haney, is an American mystery novelist.

Biography
Starting as a government typist at the age of 18, Haney worked her way up to, ultimately, senior technical writer/editor in the aerospace and international construction industries.  In the late 1980s she became interested in writing fiction, where she drew on her interest in and knowledge of ancient Egypt for a setting.  Her eight published historical mystery novels are set during the joint reign of Hatshepsut and Thutmose III, of pharaonic Egypt's 18th Dynasty.  The earlier books take place in frontier settlements along the Nile in Lower Nubia, where Lieutenant Bak and his troop of Medjay police struggle to keep order and capture offenders against the Lady Maat.  Later novels are set at various locales in ancient Egypt.

Haney's novels have been published in German, English and French, and in the Czech Republic. She has lived in Missouri, New York, and New Mexico and now makes her home in Northern California.  She travels abroad frequently, especially to the Middle East, primarily Egypt, and has contributed articles and book reviews to KMT and Ancient Egypt magazines.  Her short story Happy Birthday, Kid, won Second Prize in an international short story contest.  Her short story Murder in the Land of Wawat was nominated for an Anthony award.

Works

Lieutenant Bak series (Mystery of Ancient Egypt)
The Right Hand of Amon - La main droite d'Amon en Fr (1997)
A Face Turned Backward - Le visage de Maât en Fr (1999)
A Vile Justice - Le ventre d'Apopis en Fr (1999)
A Curse of Silence - Sous l’œil d'Horus en Fr (2000)
A Place of Darkness - Le souffle de Seth en Fr (2001)
A Cruel Deceit - Le sang de Thot en Fr (2002)
Flesh of the God (2003)
A Path of Shadows - L'ombre d'Hathor en Fr (2003)
 Parut en FR aux édition Grands Détectives 10/18"

Short StoriesA Matter of Business (1997), in KMT: A Modern Journal of Ancient Egypt, 8-3, FallHappy Birthday, Kid (2000), in anthology of prize winners World Wide Writers 3-14, ed. Frederick E. SmithMurder in the Land of Wawat (2002) in anthology The Mammoth Book of Egyptian Whodunnits, ed. Mike AskleyOnate's Foot (2009) in anthology Murder Past, Murder Present, ed. R. Barri Flowers and Jan GrapeA Certain and Untimely Death (2012) in anthology Murder Here, Murder There, ed. R. Barri Flowers and Jan Grape

NonfictionBuhen: Blueprints of an Egyptian Fortress, KMT 6:2, Summer 1995Spacious & Comfortable Dwellings: Homes of the Nobles at Akhetaten, KMT 10:2, Summer 1999Akh Isut Nebhepetre, The Mortuary Complex at Deir el Bahari of Nebhepetre Montuhotep, KMT 12:3, Fall 2001Ancient Egypt 101; A Quick Refresher Course, Amelia Peabody's Egypt: a Compendium, 2003The Belly of Stones: Ancient Egypt's Southern Frontier, Ancient Egypt 10:4, Feb/Mar 2010Royal Cemeteries of Nubia, Ancient Egypt 14:3, Dec 2013/Jan 2014Thutmose III the Builder:  The Mansions of Millions of Years, Ancient Egypt 15:1, August/September 2014Old Kingdom Settlement in Nubia, Ancient Egypt 16:6, June/July 2016Serabit el-Khadim:  The Turquoise Mountain, Ancient Egypt 18:2, October/November 2017

Book reviewsBook Report: Stuart Tyson Smith, Askut in Nubia: The Economics and Ideology of Egyptian Imperialism in the Second Millennium B.C., KMT 7:2, Summer 1996Book Shelf: Peter Lacovara, The New Kingdom Royal City (B.Winkelman), KMT 9:2, Summer 1998Book Shelf: Dietrich Wildung, ed., Sudan: Ancient Kingdoms of the Nile (Betty Winkelman), KMT 9:3, Fall 1998Book Shelf: Florence Dunn Friedman, ed., Gifts of the Nile: Ancient Egyptian Faience (B. Winkelman), KMT 10:1, Spring 1999Book Shelf: Joyce Tyldesley, Judgement of the Pharaoh: Crime and Punishment in Ancient Egypt (Betty Winkelman), KMT 12:1, Spring 2001

References

Sources
"Lynda S. Robinson and Lauren Haney: Detection in the Land of Mysteries," by Rita Rippetoe,  in The Detective as Historian: History and Art in Historical Crime Fiction'', Volume 1, edited by Ray Broadus Browne, Lawrence A. Kreiser
The Mammoth Book of Egyptian Whodunnits, Mike Ashley

20th-century American novelists
21st-century American novelists
American mystery writers
American women novelists
1936 births
Living people
Writers of historical mysteries
Women mystery writers
20th-century American women writers
21st-century American women writers
Women historical novelists
Writers of historical fiction set in antiquity
20th-century pseudonymous writers
21st-century pseudonymous writers
Pseudonymous women writers